Philip Wilkinson may refer to:

Philip Wilkinson (author) (born 1956), writer of non-fiction books
Philip Wilkinson (banker) (1927–2007), British banker
Philip Wilkinson (entrepreneur) (born 1977), founder of Kelkoo
Philip Wilkinson (cricketer) (born 1951), English cricketer
Philip Wilkinson (rower) (born 1947), Australian Olympic rower